St Mary's Collegiate and Parish Church is an Anglican church in the centre of Swansea, Wales, UK. It is considered the Civic Church of Swansea.

There was a church on the site of St Mary's since circa 1328, erected by Henry de Gower, Bishop of Saint David's.  One Sunday morning, in 1739, the roof of the nave collapsed into the church while the congregation was waiting to enter the building.  The whole structure was re-built apart from the tower.  1822 saw the church being lit by gas for the first time with thirty six lamps.  The church underwent complete renovation between 1879 and 1882 by Vicar Dr Morgan.  In 1896, the church was flattened and rebuilt again under the designs of Arthur Blomfield by Dean Allan Smith, though some parts of the old church survived the re-development. In February 1941 the church was extensively damaged by Bombing during the Blitz. It was not rebuilt until the 1950s.

From the 1890s the Swansea Devil stood on a set of buildings facing the west side of the church, constructed by a disgruntled rival of Blomfield's, angry at the commissioning of Blomfield's designs over his own.

Bells
The tower contains eight bells, which were cast in 1959 by John Taylor & Co, Loughborough with the heaviest weighing 20cwt - 2qr - 12lb (1049.2 kg) in "E". Details of the bells:-

Images

References

External links
GENUKI: Swansea
St Mary's Swansea website
Artwork at St Mary's Church, Swansea

Seansea
Collegiate churches in Wales
Grade II listed churches in Swansea
History of Swansea
Arthur Blomfield church buildings